Piotrkowice  is a village in the administrative district of Gmina Chmielnik, within Kielce County, Świętokrzyskie Voivodeship, in south-central Poland.

The village has an approximate population of 480.

References

Villages in Kielce County